Beatus was the  bishop of Urgell between 850 to 857  in the ninth century.  He was preceded by   Florenci, bishop from 840 to 850; and followed by  Guisad I, bishop from 857 to 872.

References 

Urgell
9th-century bishops in al-Andalus